Cyclostrema pentegoniostoma is a species of sea snail, a marine gastropod mollusk in the family Liotiidae.

Description

Distribution
This species occurs in the Red Sea.

References

 Vine, P. (1986). Red Sea Invertebrates. Immel Publishing, London. 224 pp.

pentegoniostoma
Gastropods described in 1856